At least two ships of the Argentine Navy have been named Heroína:

, a  launched in 1943 as USS Reading and renamed on transfer in 1947. She was scrapped in 1966.
, an  launched in 1982.

Argentine Navy ship names